Konur may refer to:

Konur (novel) ("Women"), Icelandic novel by Steinar Bragi
Konur, Nallur block, India
Konur, Gülnar, Turkey